Tamer Tuna may refer to:

 Tamer Tuna (footballer, born 1976), Turkish football player and coach
 Tamer Tuna (footballer, born 1991), Turkish football player